René Münnich (born 6 May 1977) is a German auto racing driver, team owner and entrepreneur. He is the owner and team manager of Münnich Motorsport. Münnich is also the owner of Web hosting service all-inkl.com. He made his debut in the World Touring Car Championship at the 2012 FIA WTCC Race of Japan.

Racing career

World Touring Car Championship

Special Tuning Racing (2012)

Born in Löbau, Münnich made his debut in the World Touring Car Championship at the 2012 FIA WTCC Race of Japan, driving the Special Tuning Racing SEAT León WTCC that was previously raced by Darryl O'Young. The drive would allow him to assess a possible move for his Münnich Motorsport team to the WTCC in 2013, following the discontinuation of the FIA GT1 World Championship. His best result of the weekend was 17th in race one.

Münnich Motorsport (2013–)
In November 2012, Münnich Motorsport were in final discussions to purchase three SEAT Leóns to compete in the 2013 World Touring Car Championship season for Markus Winkelhock, Marc Basseng, and Münnich himself. Soon after, Münnich Motorsport completed the purchase of two cars from the Lukoil Racing Team.

Winkelhock decided at the last minute to pull out of the project as he wanted to focus solely on GT racing, allowing the door open for reigning World Touring Car champion Robert Huff to join the team after leaving Chevrolet.

Racing record

Complete World Touring Car Championship results
(key) (Races in bold indicate pole position) (Races in italics indicate fastest lap)

† Driver did not finish the race, but was classified as he completed over 90% of the race distance.

Complete Blancpain Sprint Series results

Complete TCR International Series results
(key) (Races in bold indicate pole position) (Races in italics indicate fastest lap)

Complete FIA European Rallycross Championship results

Division 1A

Division 1

Supercar/RX1

Super1600

Complete FIA World Rallycross Championship results

Supercar/RX1/RX1e

References

External links

1977 births
Living people
People from Löbau
Motorsport team owners
Sports car racing team owners
German racing drivers
ADAC GT Masters drivers
World Touring Car Championship drivers
European Rallycross Championship drivers
World Rallycross Championship drivers
TCR International Series drivers
24H Series drivers